Kavkaz is a rural locality (a selo) in Voskresenovsky Selsoviet of Mikhaylovsky District, Amur Oblast, Russia. The population was 64 as of 2018. There are 2 streets.

Geography 
Kavkaz is located on the right bank of the Kupriyanikha River, 36 km northeast of Poyarkovo (the district's administrative centre) by road. Voskresenovka is the nearest rural locality.

References 

Rural localities in Mikhaylovsky District, Amur Oblast